Jimmie Lee Jones (born June 15, 1950) was a former American football running back who played one season with the Detroit Lions of the National Football League (NFL).  He first enrolled at East Los Angeles Junior College before transferring to the University of California, Los Angeles. He attended Manual Arts High School in Los Angeles, California. Jones also played for the Southern California Sun of the World Football League (WFL) and the Hamilton Tiger-Cats of the Canadian Football League (CFL).

References

External links
 Just Sports Stats

Living people
1950 births
American football running backs
Canadian football running backs
American players of Canadian football
Detroit Lions players
Hamilton Tiger-Cats players
Southern California Sun players
UCLA Bruins football players
Players of American football from Los Angeles
East Los Angeles Huskies football players
Players of Canadian football from Los Angeles